William Haliday Williams (December 13, 1845 – September 1, 1916) was an American soldier who fought in the American Civil War. Williams received his country's highest award for bravery during combat, the Medal of Honor. Williams's medal was won for his heroism at the Battle of Peachtree Creek in Georgia on July 20, 1864. He was honored with the award on June 19, 1894.

Williams moved to Colfax County in Nebraska after the war and worked as a brick layer, police officer and postal worker. In 1904 he was sent a newer version of the Medal of Honor without explanation. In 1912 Williams was featured as a rural mail carrier on the 4-cent U.S. Parcel Post stamp. He died in Colfax County, Nebraska, in 1916.

Medal of Honor citation

See also
List of American Civil War Medal of Honor recipients: T–Z

References

External links
 

1845 births
1916 deaths
American Civil War recipients of the Medal of Honor
People from Colfax County, Nebraska
People from Hancock County, Ohio
People of Ohio in the American Civil War
Union Army soldiers
United States Army Medal of Honor recipients